The vertical carob M29 (Gardiner M29) and the vertical date M30 (Gardiner M30) have identical meanings in the Egyptian hieroglyphic language of "sweet", and related words. The carob (hieroglyph) is a ripe carob pod w/seeds, and its meaning of "sweet" extends to items of taste, smell, and touch.

Six of them are a doubling of the word,  related to passion, concubines, etc.

See also

Gardiner's Sign List#M. Trees and Plants
List of Egyptian hieroglyphs

References

Egyptian hieroglyphs: trees and plants